Pseudotrapelus jensvindumi is a species of Agama native to Oman and the United Arab Emirates.

References 

Reptiles described in 2013
jensvindumi
Taxa named by Daniel Andreevich Melnikov
Taxa named by Natalia B. Ananjeva
Taxa named by Theodore Johnstone Papenfuss